The Eumsik dimibang or Gyugon siuibang is a Korean cookbook written around 1670 by Lady Jang (張氏, 1598~1680) from Andong Clan, Gyeongsang Province during the Joseon Dynasty. The author was in the noble yangban class and the book is a manuscript written in hangul (Korean alphabet).

Eumsik dimibang encompasses Korean cuisine in general and deals with various ways of storing foods. The book also contains 51 different entries related to traditional alcoholic beverages. It includes the earliest printed recipe for gwaha-ju (fortified rice wine). Since the book is the oldest and detailed cookbook written by a woman in Korean history, it is considered a valuable document for researching Korean cuisine.

See also
Siuijeonseo, a 19th century Korean cookbook
Gyuhap chongseo, a Korean women's encyclopedia
Korean cuisine

References

External links

  Representation of Korean traditional dishes referred in Eumsik dimibang
 Eumsikdimibang at Google Cultural Institute

Korean cookbooks
Joseon dynasty works
Korean cuisine